Harold Balk (c. 1898–1970) was an association football player who represented New Zealand at international level.

Balk made his full All Whites debut in a 1–2 loss to Australia on 9 July 1923  and ended his international playing career with five A-international caps to his credit, his final cap an appearance in a 1–2 loss to Canada on 2 July 1927.

References 

1890s births
1970 deaths
New Zealand association footballers
New Zealand international footballers
Association footballers not categorized by position